The 1972 Women's Tennis Circuit was composed of the second annual Virginia Slims Circuit, a tour of tennis tournaments for female tennis players, sponsored by Virginia Slims cigarettes and the Commercial Union Assurance Grand Prix.

Schedule 
This is a calendar of all events sponsored by Virginia Slims in the year 1972, with player progression documented from the quarterfinals stage. The table also includes the Grand Slam tournaments, the 1972 Virginia Slims Championships and the 1972 Federation Cup.

Key

December (1971)

January

February

March

April

May

June

July

August

September

October

November

December

Statistical information 
These tables present the number of singles (S), doubles (D), and mixed doubles (X) titles won by each player and each nation during the 1972 Virginia Slims Circuit. They also include data for the Grand Slam tournaments and the year-end championships. The table is sorted by:

 total number of titles (a doubles title won by two players representing the same nation counts as only one win for the nation);
 highest amount of highest category tournaments (for example, having a single Grand Slam gives preference over any kind of combination without a Grand Slam title);
 a singles > doubles > mixed doubles hierarchy;
 alphabetical order (by family names for players).

Key

Titles won by player

Titles won by nation

See also 
 1972 World Championship Tennis circuit
 1972 Grand Prix tennis circuit

References

External links 
 Women's Tennis Association (WTA) official website
 International Tennis Federation (ITF) official website

 
Virginia Slims Circuit
WTA Tour seasons